Luis Fernandez (born 1959) is a French former footballer and now coach.

Luis Fernández or Luis Fernandes may also refer to:

Luis Fernández
Luis Fernández (painter) (1594–1654), Spanish historical painter
Luis Fernández de la Vega (1601–1675), Spanish sculptor and carver
Luis Fernández de Córdoba y Arce, Spanish sailor and Governor of Chile, 1625–1629
Luis Manuel Fernández de Portocarrero (1635–1709), Spanish cardinal archbishop of Toledo
Luis Fernández de Córdova (1798–1840), Spanish military general, diplomat and first Marquis of Mendigorria
Luis Ceballos y Fernández de Córdoba (1896–1967), Spanish forest engineer and botanist
 (1900–1973), Spanish painter
Luis Colosio Fernández (1923–2010), Mexican IRP politician
Luis Enrique Fernández (born 1951), Mexican footballer
Luis Fernández (Costa Rican footballer) (born 1960), Costa Rican footballer
Luis Fernandez de la Reguera (1966–2006), American independent film director
Luis Milán Fernández (born 1970), Cuban physician
Luis Fernández (footballer, born 1972), Spanish retired footballer
Luis Fernández (actor) (born 1973), Venezuelan actor, writer, producer and director
Luis Fernández (footballer, born 1989), Paraguayan football midfielder
Luis Fernández (footballer, born 1993), Spanish footballer
Luis Fernandez (footballer, born 2001), English football defender
Luis Fernández (canoeist) (born 1997), Spanish slalom canoeist
Luis Felipe Fernandez-Salvador

Luis Fernandes
Luís Carlos Fernandes (born 1985), Brazilian footballer
Luís Filipe Ângelo Rodrigues Fernandes (born 1979)
Luís Fernandes Peixoto Gonçalves Sobrinho (born 1961)
Luiz Felipe Rodrigues Marques (born 1985), Brazilian footballer
Alexandre Luiz Fernandes (born 1986), Brazilian footballer
Luis Felipe Fernandes (born 1996), Brazilian-American soccer player
Luís Sérgio Fernandes (born 1971), Lebanese footballer